Secession of Quebec may refer to:
Reference re Secession of Quebec, a 1998 opinion by the Supreme Court of Canada
An aim of the Quebec sovereignty movement